Marie-Laure de Lorenzi (born 21 January 1961, in Biarritz) is a French professional golfer. She is also known by her married name Marie-Laure Taya, and competed using that name until midway through 1989 when she reverted to her maiden name.

De Lorenzi played for her country in the European Lady Junior's Team Championship, for players up to the age of 21, from she was 14 years old in 1975 until 1982 and was on the winning team in 1979. She also won individually in 1981.

De Lorenzi joined the Ladies European Tour in 1987 and is now a life member of the tour, having accumulated 19 tournament victories on it. She played for Europe in the first Solheim Cup, which took place in 1990, and was also a member of the European team in 1996 and 1998. She was assistant captain of the European Solheim Cup team in 2007. She retired from tournament golf in 2004.

Amateur wins

1978 Spanish International Ladies Amateur Championship
1980 Spanish International Ladies Amateur Championship
1983 Spanish International Ladies Amateur Championship

Professional wins (21)

Ladies European Tour wins (19)
1987 (2) Belgian Ladies Godiva Open, BMW Ladies' German Open
1988 (7) Letting French Open, Volmac Dutch Open, Hennessy Ladies Cup, Gothenburg Ladies Open, Laing Charity Classic, Woolmark Ladies' Matchplay, Qualitair Spanish Open
1989 (3) Ford Ladies' Classic, Hennessy Ladies Cup, BMW Ladies Classic
1990 (1) Ford Ladies' Classic
1993 (1) VAR Open de France Feminin
1994 (1) La Manga Spanish Open
1995 (3) Costa Azul Ladies Open, Staatsloterij Ladies Open, Nestlé French Ladies Open
1997 (1) Déesse Ladies' Swiss Open

Other wins (2)
1988 Benson & Hedges Trophy (with Mark McNulty)
1993 Lalla Meryem Cup

Team appearances
Amateur
European Lady Junior's Team Championship (representing France): 1975, 1978, 1979 (winners), 1980, 1981, 1982
European Ladies' Team Championship (representing France): 1979, 1981
Espirito Santo Trophy (representing France): 1978, 1980, 1982, 1986

Professional
Solheim Cup (representing Europe): 1990, 1996, 1998

See also
List of golfers with most Ladies European Tour wins

References

External links

French female golfers
Ladies European Tour golfers
Solheim Cup competitors for Europe
Sportspeople from Biarritz
Sportspeople from Barcelona
1961 births
Living people
20th-century French women